Camarines Norte Chung Hua High School Foundation, Inc. (Abbreviation: CNCHHSFI) located at 1419 Zabala Street, Daet, Camarines Norte, Philippines. It is the only trilingual institution serving Filipino-Chinese youth in the heart of the Province of Camarines Norte.

Established and founded last October 12, 1921, CNCHHSFI, also known as Chung Hua High School (CHHS) produces different notable alumni within and outside the country.

Campus
Located at Zabala Street, Daet, Camarines Norte, a 5 hectares land campus houses the more than ten hundred grade school and high school students of CHHS.

History

Early 1921

Year 2000

New campus buildings

Centennial celebration (2021)

Administrators

CNCHHSFI Board of Trustees

Department/Office Heads

Admission
Admission for Pre-school, Grade School and High School are welcome to enroll provided that they have complete requirements upon the start of the school year. Transfer students are also welcome.

Academic departments

English Department
CHHS follows a curriculum provided by the Department of Education (DepEd) and is implementing the K-12 program as advised.

Chinese Department
The Chinese department of the school is not compulsory, however, every parent is encouraged to enroll their children.

Computer/I.T. Department

Facilities and buildings

The Ongtengco Building
The Ongtengco Building is the main building of the school which houses the administrative offices and some classrooms. The Office of the Principal, the Office of the Registrar, the Faculty Office, the Cashier are located at the ground floor of the main building. Classrooms and club offices can be found at the second and third floor of the main building.

Luis Yao Teng Building
The Science laboratory for Elementary and Secondary students are found in the second floor of this building while the computer laboratory for the secondary department is located in the ground floor.

Alumni Hall
Alumni hall houses fifteen classrooms for Grade School Department.

CHHS Batch Hall
This hall houses classrooms and the covered social hall where different indoor events can be accommodated.
The ground floor also provide space for the speech laboratory and the computer laboratory for grade school department.

Typoco Building
The Preparatory (Kinder 1, 2, and Nursery) of the school is located in the ground floor of the hall while the upper floors houses some laboratories for the student.

The Library
A collection of different books can be found for student research and reference work can be found in the library.

The Dormitory
Chinese Department faculties stays in the dormitory of the School while the ground floor is the cafeteria of the school.

The Physical Activities Spaces

Student life

Leadership Organizations

Student Government Organization (SGO)
The student body elect a set of officer each school year to provide activities and programs for the students. The SGO hosts activities such as acquaintance parties, the sports fest (Intramurals), spelling contest, musical contest, among others. The organization aim to serve as a training ground for student leader for school and community.
The SGO also participate in the Annual Boys and Girls Week hosted by the local municipal and provincial government, the National Leadership Training for Student Government Officers, and others.

Before 2004 Presidents

2003-2004: Lester Vinzons

2002-2003:

2001-2002:

1998-1999: Maria Odea B. Ching

1992-1993: Aileen Lo

1991-1992:Cheryl Ching

Subject Organizations

Science-Math Club

TLE/THE Club

2015 PRESIDENT: ROXETTE RAYA Y. TANZO

Interest Clubs

The Dragon
The Dragon is the Official School Paper. The paper was published two to three times every school year.

Drum and Bugle Corps (DBC)

Scouting
Boy Scout and Girl Scout

The Boy and Girl Scout is open to all students from Grade 1 to 12 students of the school. The scouting club aims to open the awareness of the students in the community and to the current issues of the locality. They participate in different activities provided by the Boy and Girl Scout of the Philippines.

Red Cross Youth
The CHHS Red Cross Youth follows the activities provided by the local chapter of Philippine Red Cross in Camarines Norte. The RCY of CHHS is involved in community development, in disaster preparedness, in first aid training, and leadership formation.

Dance Club

Speech Club

CAT
The CAT or Civil Awareness Training Program is open to all third year (optional) and fourth year students (required).

Sports Organization
 Basketball
 Volleyball
 Badminton
 Table Tennis
 Archery
 Swimming
 Football
 Soccer

Awards

Cheers / School Hymn

Notable alumni
Ricky Lee - Award-winning Scriptwriter

References

Chinese-language schools in the Philippines
Schools in Camarines Norte
High schools in the Philippines